Malak-Malak (also spelt Mullukmulluk, Malagmalag), also known as Ngolak-Wonga (Nguluwongga), is an Australian Aboriginal language spoken by the Mulluk-Mulluk people. Malakmalak is nearly extinct, with children growing up speaking Kriol or English instead. The language is spoken in the Daly River area around Woolianna and Nauiyu. The Kuwema or Tyaraity (Tyeraty) variety is distinct.

Classification
Malakmalak was formerly classified in a Northern Daly family along with the "Anson Bay" group of Wagaydy (Patjtjamalh, Wadjiginy, Kandjerramalh) and the unattested Giyug.  Green concluded that Wagaydy and Malakmalak were two separate language families. Some later classifications have linked them such as Bowern (2011). However, the Wagaydy people are recent arrivals in the area, and their language may only similar due to borrowing. AIATSIS and Glottolog both treat Wagaydy as an isolate and Giyug as unclassifiable.

In contemporary usage, "Northern Daly" (e.g. Harvey 2003, Cahir 2006, Nordlinger 2017) most often refers specifically to the group of languages which includes Malakmalak and Tyerraty (also known as Guwema), a variety with which MalakMalak differs significantly in vocabulary (65% according to Tryon's 200 word list), but is very close to morphologically.

Phonology

Vowels

Consonants

Plosives /p t c k/ may be heard as voiced as [b d ɟ ɡ] when intervocalic.

Typological classification 
MalakMalak, is an ergative-absolutive language with constituent order mainly determined by information structure and prosody, but syntactically free. Marking of core-cases is optional. The language is mostly dependent-marking (1), but also has no marking (2) and head-marking features (2).

Morphosyntactic properties 
MalakMalak's verb phrase uses complex predicates. These consist of an inflecting verb that has properties of person, number and tense. MalakMalak only has six such verbs. In example (4), yuyu and vida are inflecting verbs. Additionally, there are coverbs which have aspectual properties, but do not inflect for number, tense or person. They occur with inflecting verbs. They are unlimited in number and new verbs are also borrowed into this class. In (4), kubuk-karrarr, dat-tyed, and ka are coverbs. They can also form serial verbs (kubuk-karrarr, dat-tyed).

Spatial Language 
MalakMalak employs all three "classic" types of spatial Frames of Reference: intrinsic, relative and absolute. Additionally, the language uses place names and body-part orientation to talk about space. The intrinsic Frame requires some kind of portioning of the ground object or landmark into named facets from which search domains can be projected. In English this would be, for example, the tree is in front of the man. And in MalakMalak it would be (5).

The relative Frame of Reference involves mapping from the observer's own axes (front, back, left, right) onto the ground object. An English example is the ball is on the right. In MalakMalak it would be (6)

The absolute Frame of Reference requires xed bearings that are instantly available to all members of the community. An English example is the opera is west of here. In MalakMalak, three different types of absolute frames can be used. Those based on the course of the sun (east/west) (7a), on prevailing winds (northwesterly/southeasterly) (7b), and on two sides of the prominent Daly River (northeastern/southwestern bank) (7c).

Vocabulary
The following basic vocabulary items of Northern Daly language varieties are from Tryon (1968).

{| class="wikitable sortable"
! no. !! gloss !! Mullukmulluk !! Djeraity
|-
| 1 || head || pundɔ || pundu
|-
| 2 || hair || pundɔmæk || pundumæR
|-
| 3 || eyes || numɔrɔ || numɔrɔ
|-
| 4 || nose || yinïn || yinun
|-
| 5 || ear || čawœr || muninǰawœr
|-
| 6 || tooth || dit || diR
|-
| 7 || tongue || ŋændɛl || ŋændulk
|-
| 8 || shoulder || mœndœl || mændœm
|-
| 9 || elbow || pimïle || pimilu
|-
| 10 || hand || naɲïl || naɲulk
|-
| 11 || breasts || wiyœ || wiŋ
|-
| 12 || back || payak || daɲ
|-
| 13 || belly || pœɲ || pœɲ
|-
| 14 || navel || čœčœt || čœčuruk
|-
| 15 || heart || mændulma || mændulma
|-
| 16 || urine || wurɔ || wurɔ
|-
| 17 || excrete || wœn || wœn
|-
| 18 || thigh || čæt || čæR
|-
| 19 || leg || wilit || dulk
|-
| 20 || knee || pœŋgœl || pœŋgœl
|-
| 21 || foot || maǰan || mæl
|-
| 22 || skin || ŋæčïdl || karala
|-
| 23 || fat || milyœ || laɲ
|-
| 24 || blood || dawut || padawɔ
|-
| 25 || bone || nœrœt || murɔ
|-
| 26 || man || yiɲa || lœlambœr
|-
| 27 || woman || alawaR || alœrguR
|-
| 28 || father || baŋa || papaŋa
|-
| 29 || mother || wiyaŋa || kalaŋa
|-
| 30 || grandmother || æǰæŋa || ŋeyæčɔ
|-
| 31 || policeman || čæyæčman || čayačdiɲ
|-
| 32 || spear || čaŋar || čaŋal
|-
| 33 || woomera || yarawa || maduR
|-
| 34 || boomerang || čïmbičïmbič || čïmbičïmbič
|-
| 35 || nullanulla || warawara || čændæɲ
|-
| 36 || hair-belt || pudur || purur
|-
| 37 || canoe || wænde || wændɔ
|-
| 38 || axe || walyïmba || ličpuRp
|-
| 39 || dilly bag || karɛr || pæmbuR
|-
| 40 || fire || čœŋ || čuŋɔ
|-
| 41 || smoke || wæn || wæn
|-
| 42 || water || wak || wak
|-
| 43 || cloud || durɔ || pæRk
|-
| 44 || rainbow || dæpulɔlɔy || pulɔlɔy
|-
| 45 || barramundi || wɔ || wɔ
|-
| 46 || sea || ŋambač || ŋambač
|-
| 47 || river || wakwurɔ || wurɔ
|-
| 48 || stone || wadlk || wulɔ
|-
| 49 || ground || pawuRk || wœnǰœ
|-
| 50 || track || yære || æRɔ
|-
| 51 || dust || pulɔ || pulɔ
|-
| 52 || sun || mïre || mirɔ
|-
| 53 || moon || yædlk || yœlk
|-
| 54 || star || nœmœrœl || numurudl
|-
| 55 || night || puwaR || poyædɔ
|-
| 56 || tomorrow || nœyænœ || nuŋɔyɔ
|-
| 57 || today || æmæn || æɲika
|-
| 58 || big || wunædle || wudælɔ
|-
| 59 || possum || wœyœ || wœyœ
|-
| 60 || dog || moyiɲ || moweyiɲ
|-
| 61 || tail || wœmœ || wumɔ
|-
| 62 || meat || dæ || dæ
|-
| 63 || snake || ŋunǰul || čalala
|-
| 64 || red kangaroo || čæyœt || manduRk
|-
| 65 || porcupine || mænɛŋɛč || manɛŋɛč
|-
| 66 || emu || čïnburat || ŋœrœɲ
|-
| 67 || crow || waŋgïr || waŋguR
|-
| 68 || goanna || čæriɲ || čæɲ
|-
| 69 || blue tongue lizard || kumugut || pɛrɛt
|-
| 70 || mosquito || wænŋɛn || wænŋun
|-
| 71 || sugar-bag || piǰak || ŋœčœn
|-
| 72 || camp || dæk || dæk
|-
| 73 || black || eyïkeyïk || eyukeyuk
|-
| 74 || white || puŋma || tamalma
|-
| 75 || red || widma || witma
|-
| 76 || one || yanakŋa || yawunuka
|-
| 77 || two || wæræna || wærunuka
|-
| 78 || when? || amanæle || ŋædekælædiɲ
|-
| 79 || what? || nïgidæ || nïgidæ
|-
| 80 || who? || eyɛn || aŋon
|-
| 81 || I || ŋa || ŋa
|-
| 82 || you || waŋare || niɲ
|-
| 83 || he || yœndœn || yœndœn
|-
| 84 || grass || wæne || wænœ
|-
| 85 || vegetable food || mi || miyɔ
|-
| 86 || tree || čœŋ || čuŋɔ
|-
| 87 || leaf || dæmbæl || wœR
|-
| 88 || pandanus || murɔmurɔ || narɔ
|-
| 89 || ironwood || pawit || æluRk
|-
| 90 || ripe || moeŋœɲ || damberæmæ
|-
| 91 || good || yunbayan || munbayɛn
|-
| 92 || bad || yinat || munætɔ
|-
| 93 || blind || wuɲak || wuɲ
|-
| 94 || deaf || ɲabɔ || ŋamama
|-
| 95 || saliva || čalïlk || čalulk
|}

References

Hoffmann, Dorothea. http://drdorotheahoffmann.wordpress.com
Hoffmann, Dorothea (2015). “Moving through space and (not?) time: North Australian dreamtime narratives,” Narratives from the South Pacific: Sociocultural explorations, ed. by F. Gounder. Amsterdam: John Benjamins Publishing Company, 15-35
Hoffmann, Dorothea (2014). “Mapping the Language: How a dying language loses its place in the world”, Endangered Words, Signs of Revival, ed. by Ghil'ad Zuckermann, J. Miller, and J. Morley, Adelaide: Australex, 1-18

External links
 MalakMalak at the Dalylanguages.org website.

Daly languages
Extinct languages of the Northern Territory
Language isolates of Australia
Severely endangered languages